The Carl D. Perkins Vocational and Technical Education Act was first authorized by the federal government in 1984 and reauthorized in 1990 (Perkins II), 1998 (Perkins III), 2006 (Perkins IV), and 2018 (Perkins V). Named for Carl D. Perkins, the act aims to increase the quality of technical education within the United States in order to help the economy.

On July 31, 2018, President Donald Trump signed into law the re-authorization of the Act of 2018. The new law, the Strengthening Career and Technical Education for the 21st Century (Perkins V) Act, was passed almost unanimously by Congress.

The Perkins IV re-authorization included three major areas of revision:
 Using the term "career and technical education" instead of "vocational education"
 Maintaining the Tech Prep program as a separate federal funding stream within the legislation
 Maintaining state administrative funding at 5 percent of a state's allocation

The Perkins IV law also included new requirements for “programs of study” that link academic and technical content across secondary and post-secondary education, and strengthened local accountability provisions that will ensure continuous program improvement.

The Perkins Act provides $1.2 billion in federal support for career and technical education programs in all 50 States, including support for integrated career pathways programs. The law was extended through 2024.

Notes

External links 
 Carl D. Perkins Vocational and Technical Education Act Background Page from Association for Career and Technical Education
  United States Department of Education Perkins reauthorization page

United States federal education legislation
1984 in American law
1998 in American law
2006 in American law
98th United States Congress
United States federal legislation articles without infoboxes
1984 in education
1998 in education
2006 in education